Ross is a small incorporated town in Marin County, California, United States, just north of San Francisco. The population was 2,338 at the 2020 census. The town is bordered by San Rafael to the east, Kentfield to the south, San Anselmo to the north, and the Mount Tamalpais protected watershed to the west.

Ross is named in honor of James Ross, who acquired Rancho Punta de Quentin in 1859.

History
After the Mexican Revolution of 1821, the "land grant" system of parceling out land gave rise to what is now known as Marin County. Ross was originally part of an  Mexican land grant to Juan B.R. Cooper in 1840 known as Ranch Punta de Quentin Canada de San Anselmo.

In 1857, James Ross (1812–1862) bought Rancho Punta de Quentin for $50,000. Ross, a Scot who had arrived in San Francisco from Australia in 1848 and made his fortune in the wholesale liquor business, set up a trading post called "Ross Landing". He built his home on Redwood Drive and moved there with his wife and three children. When James Ross died in 1862, his wife, Annie Ross, was forced to sell a portion of her husband's larger land holdings to pay each of their daughters $10,000. The remaining  comprises the present-day Town of Ross.

The first post office opened in 1887, and Ross incorporated in 1908.

Geography

Demographics

2010
At the 2010 census Ross had a population of 2,415. The racial makeup of Ross was 2,265 (93.8%) White, 6 (0.2%) African American, 2 (0.1%) Native American, 45 (1.9%) Asian, 3 (0.1%) Pacific Islander, 19 (0.8%) from other races, and 75 (3.1%) from two or more races. Hispanic or Latino of any race were 94 people (3.9%).

The census reported that 2,363 people (97.8% of the population) lived in households, 52 (2.2%) lived in non-institutionalized group quarters, and no one was institutionalized.

There were 798 households, 357 (44.7%) had children under the age of 18 living in them, 575 (72.1%) were opposite-sex married couples living together, 55 (6.9%) had a female householder with no husband present, 28 (3.5%) had a male householder with no wife present.  There were 13 (1.6%) unmarried opposite-sex partnerships, and 7 (0.9%) same-sex married couples or partnerships. 120 households (15.0%) were one person and 60 (7.5%) had someone living alone who was 65 or older. The average household size was 2.96.  There were 658 families (82.5% of households); the average family size was 3.26.

The age distribution was 731 people (30.3%) under the age of 18, 108 people (4.5%) aged 18 to 24, 362 people (15.0%) aged 25 to 44, 801 people (33.2%) aged 45 to 64, and 413 people (17.1%) who were 65 or older.  The median age was 45.1 years. For every 100 females, there were 92.0 males.  For every 100 females age 18 and over, there were 89.0 males.

There were 884 housing units at an average density of 568.0 per square mile, of the occupied units 686 (86.0%) were owner-occupied and 112 (14.0%) were rented. The homeowner vacancy rate was 1.0%; the rental vacancy rate was 5.7%.  2,078 people (86.0% of the population) lived in owner-occupied housing units and 285 people (11.8%) lived in rental housing units.

2000
At the 2000 census there were 2,329 people, 761 households, and 626 families in the town. The racial makeup of the town in 2010 was 90.9% non-Hispanic White, 0.2% non-Hispanic African American, 1.9% Asian, 0.1% Pacific Islander, 0.3% from other races, and 2.7% from two or more races. Hispanic or Latino of any race were 3.9%.

Of the 761 households 44.3% had children under the age of 18 living with them, 72.0% were married couples living together, 7.0% had a female householder with no husband present, and 17.7% were non-families. 12.7% of households were one person and 5.3% were one person aged 65 or older.  The average household size was 2.94 and the average family size was 3.21.

The age distribution was 30.2% under the age of 18, 3.4% from 18 to 24, 21.3% from 25 to 44, 32.8% from 45 to 64, and 12.4% 65 or older. The median age was 42 years. For every 100 females, there were 94.9 males. For every 100 females age 18 and over, there were 86.0 males.

The median income for a household in the town was $102,015, and the median family income  was $102,593. Males had a median income of $75,784 versus $52,083 for females. The per capita income for the town was $51,150. About 5.6% of families and 8.5% of the population were below the poverty line, including 6.2% of those under age 18 and 5.7% of those age 65 or over.

Arts and culture
Landmarks include the Ross Bear sculpture by Beniamino Bufano located near town hall, and the Marin Art and Garden Center.

Government
According to the California Secretary of State, as of February 10, 2019, Ross has 1,606 registered voters. Of those, 685 (42.7%) are registered Democrats, 380 (23.7%) are registered Republicans, and 472 (29.4%) have declined to state a political party.

Education
 The Branson School
 Ross School

Notable people

 Jim Calhoun, founder of Ross Valley Cougar Preservation Society
 Signy Coleman, actress
 Dylan Penn, model and daughter of actors Sean Penn and Robin Wright.
 Maria Pitillo, actress
 Jack Woolams, test pilot
 Isabella Worn, garden designer

References

External links
 

1908 establishments in California
Cities in Marin County, California
Cities in the San Francisco Bay Area
Incorporated cities and towns in California
Populated places established in 1857